Getashen or Getachen may refer to:

 Getashen, Armavir, Armenia
 alternate name of Getazat, Armenia
 former name of Kirants, Armenia
 Nerkin Getashen, Armenia
 Verin Getashen, Armenia
 Çaykənd, Goygol, Azerbaijan

See also
 Getishen, Armenia
 Gtashen, Armenia